The Chonos Archipelago is a series of low, mountainous, elongated islands with deep bays, traces of a submerged Chilean Coast Range. Most of the islands are forested with little or no human settlement. The deep Moraleda Channel separates the islands of the Chonos Archipelago from the mainland of Chile and from Magdalena Island.

The largest islands are Melchor Island, Benjamin Island, Traiguen Island, Riveros Island, Cuptana Island, James Island, Victoria Island, Simpson Island, Level Island, Luz Island.

Far out in the Pacific is Guamblin Island with the Isla Guamblin National Park. The National park comprises about 106 km². Blue whales can often be seen here.

Some groups of islands are grouped into minor archipelagoes such as the Guaitecas Archipelago. The Guaitecas Archipelago has its own municipality and possesses the only settlement in the archipelago, Melinka. All islands are part of the Aisén Region.

Chonos Archipelago was mapped in the 18th and 19th centuries by José de Moraleda y Montero (1793), Robert FitzRoy (1834) and Enrique Simpson (1870–71).

Most of the archipelago is covered by a more-less open Pilgerodendron forest with cushion plants such as Astelia pumila, Donatia fascicularis and Oreobolus obtusangulus. In the western fringes of the archipelago a shrubland of c. 2 meter high  Pilgerondendron and Nothofagus nitida grows. Amidst this shrubland ocacional peatlands and forest exists.

See also
 List of islands of Chile

External links
 Islands of Chile @ United Nations Environment Programme
 World island information @ WorldIslandInfo.com
 South America Island High Points above 1000 meters
 United States Hydrographic Office, South America Pilot (1916)

References

Bibliography

 
Ecoregions of Chile
Archipelagoes of Chile
Islands of Aysén Region
Archipelagoes of the Pacific Ocean